Jack Dennington (22 July 1907 – 11 July 1994) was  a former Australian rules footballer who played with Footscray in the Victorian Football League (VFL).

Notes

External links 
		

1907 births
1994 deaths
Australian rules footballers from Victoria (Australia)
Western Bulldogs players